Tomás Picó Hormeño (16 January 1940 – 29 March 2013) was a Spanish actor and theater director known for La gran familia and Canción de juventud (1962).

Son of an architect, he was born on 16 January 1940 in Cáceres and began his film career in the early 1960s. He made his debut at Teatro Eslava and he worked along Lina Morgan. He played George in Case of the Scorpion's Tale (1971), starring Evelyne Stewart. He appeared in Al Andalus, el camino del sol (1988), by Jaime Oriol and Antonio Tarruella.

In 2009 he was diagnosed with a lymphoma, and died four years later on 29 March 2013 at the age of 73 in Tarifa, Cádiz.

Filmography

References

External links
 

1940 births
2013 deaths
20th-century Spanish male actors
Spanish male television actors
Spanish male film actors
Spanish theatre directors
Deaths from cancer in Spain
Deaths from lymphoma